Mangueira is a railway station in Mangueira, Rio de Janeiro which is serviced by the Supervia.

History 
Namesake of the Mangueira Samba School, and previously part of the Central do Brasil Railroad, Mangueira Station now is the fourth station after Central do Brasil Station on the suburban Deodoro Line, after Praça da Bandeira, São Cristóvão and Maracanã. The station was named Mangueira when it was opened in 1869 due to a local hat factory known as the Fábrica das Mangueiras, or Mango Tree Factory, due to the large amount of mangoes that were grown there. In 1937, the line was electrified, with a substation being built next to the station. Due to being too close to the rebuilt Maracanã Station, Mangueira Station was closed in August 2014. However, following the construction of a 77-metre-long passageway to platform 1 of Maracanã Station on 22 February 2016, Mangueira was reopened to passengers.

Platforms
Platform 1A: Towards Deodoro (Stopper)
Platform 1B: Towards Central do Brasil (Stopper)

External links 
 Supervia webpage

SuperVia stations

References